The voalavoanala (Gymnuromys roberti) is a species of rodent in the family Nesomyidae.  It is the only species in the genus Gymnuromys. It is found only in Madagascar. Its natural habitat is tropical dry forests.

References

Nesomyinae
Mammals of Madagascar
Mammals described in 1896
Taxa named by Charles Immanuel Forsyth Major
Taxonomy articles created by Polbot